Christopher Codrington (1668–1710) was a Barbadian-born soldier, planter, and colonial governor.

Christopher Codrington may also refer to:

Christopher Codrington (colonial administrator) (1640s–1698), Barbadian-born planter and colonial administrator
Christopher Bethell-Codrington (1764–1843), British member of Parliament and sugar planter, previously called Christopher Codrington
Christopher William Codrington (1805–1864), British member of parliament